Sasha McLeod (born August 26th 2001), known professionally as Sycco, is an Aboriginal Australian singer-songwriter and producer from Brisbane. She was nominated for Triple J Unearthed Artist of the Year in 2020, having released the pop singles "Nicotine" and "Dribble" in the same year.

Early life
McLeod grew up in Brisbane, Queensland. She confirmed during a performance in Melbourne, she has a Virgo Sun, Sagittarius Moon, and Capricorn Rising.
Has also developed an interest in bakeries.

Career
McLeod's father taught her to play the guitar at seven years old. She began making music from an early age, having created an album at the age of 15, and adopted the artist name Sycco as a reference to psychedelia.

McLeod's debut single "Starboard Square" was released in August 2018. She also released "Tamed Grief" and "Peacemaker" in 2019. In 2020, Sycco released the singles "Nicotine" and "Dribble", leading her to be nominated for Triple J Unearthed Artist of the Year at the J Awards of 2020.

McLeod has performed at St Jerome's Laneway Festival, and supported Vera Blue and Spacey Jane on tour. She also covered Tame Impala and Pnau for Like a Version.

In March 2022, Sycco released "Superstar". Of the song, Sycco said “I’m really proud of this song... the lyrics are satirical obviously – I used to work at a grocery store and it was fun to imagine a glowed-up future me having a tantrum in there."

In September 2022, Sycco released "Ripple". In a press release, Sycco said the track was "really fun" to make and "came together super quickly". Sycco said Flume and Chrome Sparks "did such a great job on the prod[uction]", developing what she describes as "a beautiful environment of synths and drums that evoke such a nice feeling of ease but also discomfort at points".

Discography

Extended plays

Singles

As lead artist

As featured artist

Promotional singles

Awards and nominations

APRA Awards
The APRA Awards are held in Australia and New Zealand by the Australasian Performing Right Association to recognise songwriting skills, sales and airplay performance by its members annually.

! 
|-
| 2022
| herself
| Breakthrough Songwriter of the Year
| 
| 
|-

AIR Awards
The Australian Independent Record Awards (known colloquially as the AIR Awards) is an annual awards night to recognise, promote and celebrate the success of Australia's Independent Music sector.

! 
|-
| 2021
| Herself
| Breakthrough Independent Artist of the Year
| 
| 
|-
| 2022
| "Weakness" (with Alice Ivy)
| Best Independent Dance, Electronica or Club Single
| 
|

J Awards
The J Awards are an annual series of Australian music awards that were established by the Australian Broadcasting Corporation's youth-focused radio station Triple J. They commenced in 2005.

! 
|-
! scope="row" rowspan="1"| 2020 
| Herself
| Unearthed Artist of the Year
| 
| 
|}

National Indigenous Music Awards
The National Indigenous Music Awards recognise excellence, innovation and leadership among Aboriginal and Torres Strait Islander musicians from throughout Australia. They commenced in 2004.

! 
|-
! scope="row" rowspan="3"| 2021
| Herself
| Artist of the Year
| 
| rowspan="3"| 
|-
| "Dribble"
| Song of the Year
| 
|-
| "My Ways"
| Film Clip of the Year
| 
|}

Queensland Music Awards
The Queensland Music Awards (previously known as Q Song Awards) are annual awards celebrating Queensland, Australia's brightest emerging artists and established legends. They commenced in 2006.

 (wins only)
! 
|-
! scope="row" rowspan="2"| 2021
| rowspan="2" | "Dribble"
| Song of the Year
| 
| rowspan="2"| 
|-
| Pop Song of the Year
| 
|-
! scope="row" rowspan="2"| 2022
| rowspan="2" | "My Ways"
| Song of the Year
| 
| rowspan="2"| 
|-
| Pop Song of the Year
| 
|}

References

External links
 

2002 births
21st-century Australian singers
21st-century Australian women singers
Australian women pop singers
Australian musicians
Future Classic artists
Living people
Musicians from Brisbane